Dr. Ring Ding (Richard Alexander Jung) is a German reggae, ska and dancehall artist.

In the more than 20 years of his musical activity, he has become an integral part of the international music scene.

Jung lives in Germany, but spent a part of his childhood in his mother's native France. At the age of six he started playing the recorder and switched later to playing the trumpet and eventually the trombone.

In 1987, he joined the German ska band El Bosso & die Ping-Pongs as trombonist and second front man, using the stage name Prof. Richie Senior. On Christmas Eve 1992 he formed the prolific band Dr. Ring-Ding & The Senior Allstars which split then years later in October 2002. Among other styles, Dr. Ring Ding utilised the Jamaican singing style, toasting mixing Reggae, Dancehall and traditional Ska beats. Dr. Ring Ding is known for his Ska and Reggae collaborations with artists including Lord Tanamo, Derrick Morgan, Laurel Aitken, Judge Dread, Vic Ruggiero, and many others. He has also performed with the Skatalites and The Toasters. Dr. Ring Ding also earned acclaim with a cover of the Johnny Cash song Ring of Fire which he recorded with the German crossover Band H-Blockx. The single reached No.13 in the German charts. He works as producer and studio musician for ska, swing, punk and jazz bands and guests with various outfits, regularly touring Europe, North America and Asia.

With members of the Rotterdam Ska-Jazz Foundation, he formed the band Kingston Kitchen, presenting a mix of traditional Ska, Blues and Swing.

In 2012, Dr. Ring Ding formed a new project entitled Dr. Ring Ding Ska-Vaganza with musicians from Germany, Catalonia, the US, and other countries, dedicated to playing traditionally flavored jazzy ska. The album Piping Hot was released in 2012.

Chart performance
His song "Doctor's Darling" got its highest chart position, 23, in May 2003. Despite Dr. Ring-Ding being white, the song was included in the German black charts.

Discography
Dr. Ring-Ding & The Senior Allstars album discography :
Dandimite (Pork Pie) 1995
Ram Di Dance (Grover Records) 1997
Diggin' Up Dirt (Grover Records) 1999
Big Up (Grover Records) 2001
Pick Up The Pieces (Grover Records) 2001
Golden Gate (Grover Records) 2002

Dr. Ring-Ding & The Senior Allstars also play on:
 Doreen Shaffer Adorable (Grover Records) 1997
 Lord Tanamo Best Place in The World (Grover Records) 2000

Dr. Ring Ding solo and in other outfits:
Dr. Ring Ding meets H.P. Setter Big T'ings (T'Bwana) 1996
Dub Guerilla Dub Guerilla (Enja / E19) 2005
Kingston Kitchen Today's Special (Megalith) 2007
Back And Forth (Jump Up Records) 2007
Nice Again (Kingstone Records) 2007
Dr. Ring Ding Ska-Vaganza Piping Hot (Pork Pie (CD) / Buenritmo (LP)) 2012
Dr. Ring Ding and Kingston Rudieska Ska 'n Seoul (Rudie System) 2014
Dr. Ring Ding & Dreadsquad Dig It All (Superfly Studio) 2014
Dr. Ring Ding Gwaan (&March Forth) (Gecko Rex/Flat Daddy) 2014
Dr. Ring Ding Ska-Vaganza Bingo Bongo (Pork Pie) 2015
Dr. Ring Ding Once A Year (Pork Pie) 2015
Dr. Ring Ding The Remedy (Pork Pie) 2020

Further reading
 "Interview Di Doctor", by Jon Twitch, Broke in Korea #17 (2014)
 More fanzine coverage on Internet Archive

References

External links

 

1970 births
Living people
People from Münster
German people of French descent
Ska musicians
German reggae musicians
21st-century German  male singers